"No More Sad Songs" is a song by British girl group Little Mix, from the group's fourth studio album, Glory Days (2016). A remixed version of the song featuring American rapper Machine Gun Kelly, was released on March 3, 2017 as the third single from the album. The song is included on the reissue of the group's fourth studio album Glory Days: The Platinum Edition (2017). "No More Sad Songs" was met with positive reviews. An electro and tropical pop track, that lyrically addresses a break up. The song reached number fifteen on the UK Singles Chart, becoming the group's sixteenth top twenty hit there. The single also charted in Ireland, New Zealand, and the Philippines. It has since been certified platinum in the United Kingdom and Brazil.

Background and release
A remixed version of the song, featuring rapper Machine Gun Kelly, was announced as the third single from Glory Days on 1 March 2017 and was released on 3 March 2017.

Critical reception
Digital Spy's writer Lewis Corner stated: "Now that the break-up has well and truly sunk in, the girls are trying to put it behind them by getting back out there and enjoying their lives again. The one request? No more sad songs, obviously. "I'm still trying to put this behind me / I still want to know who's taking you home," Perrie admits on the verse, before it bursts into a spirited electronic-tinged chorus that you can really get swept up in with its addictive squiggles. It's a beautifully defiant twist on a subtle club banger, and Perrie's big vocal run at the end is a real moment."

Attitude named the song #7 on their list of 32 greatest Little Mix singles writing "underrated based on its chart peak but this mid-tempo sad-banger was an immediate highlight and obvious single from the moment the album was released."

Music video
The music video for the song was released on 29 March 2017. It is set in Nashville and based on Coyote Ugly.

Charts

Weekly charts

Year-end charts

Certifications

Release history

References

2016 songs
2017 singles
Little Mix songs
Machine Gun Kelly (musician) songs
Songs written by Edvard Forre Erfjord
Songs written by Henrik Barman Michelsen
Syco Music singles
Songs written by Emily Warren
Songs written by Machine Gun Kelly (musician)